The BBC World War I centenary season was the marking of the centenary of the First World War across the BBC. Programming started in 2014 and lasted until 2018, corresponding to 100 years after the war. The BBC season included 130 newly-commissioned radio and television programmes which lasted over 2500 hours, including more than 600 hours of new content. The programmes were broadcast on over twenty BBC television and radio stations.

Overview
The First World War centenary season was announced on 16 October 2013 by the BBC. Adrian Van Klaveren, the BBC World War I centenary controller called the project the "biggest and most ambitious pan-BBC project ever commissioned". The series featured a wide variety of programming that according to its producers were intended to present a more neutral and accurate picture of the war than the view commonly held by the public. In support of this goal, several programmes explored lesser-known topics such as the experiences of troops from New Zealand and Australia in the Gallipoli Campaign and several others focused on presenting the impact that the war had had on the world today. Other programmes attempted to show the effect that the war had on the individuals involved in it and one documentary showed numerous veteran interviews that were filmed for the BBC documentary The Great War on the conflict's fiftieth anniversary in 1964 but were omitted from that programme.

The series also featured a number of live broadcasts on the 100th anniversaries of significant events during the war, beginning with a broadcast from Sarajevo, the site of assassination of Archduke Franz Ferdinand of Austria, on 28 June 2014. Other event anniversaries had dedicated live broadcasts include the Battle of the Somme on 1 July 2016, the Battle of Jutland on 31 May 2016, and the Battle of Passchendaele on 31 July 2017, plus the annual Remembrance Sunday event at the Cenotaph.

The programmes were be broadcast on over twenty different BBC television and radio stations including BBC One, BBC Two, BBC Three, BBC Four, BBC Parliament, BBC News, BBC World News, BBC Alba, CBBC, CBeebies, BBC World Service, BBC Radio 1, BBC Radio 2, BBC Radio 3, BBC Radio 4, BBC Radio Cymru, BBC Radio Ulster, BBC Radio Foyle, BBC Radio Scotland, BBC Radio nan Gàidheal and BBC Asian Network.

Programmes

Documentaries

Historical debate

Arts and music
The following Arts & Music programmes were shown: Artists of War, Writers of the Somme, The Great War – An Elegy: A Culture Show Special, The Poet who Loved the War: Ivor Gurney, 1914–1918 – The Cultural Front, Music on the Brink, The Ballads of the Great War, Live in Concert – The Vienna Philharmonic in Sarajevo, A Soldier and a Maker – Ivor Gurney on Radio 3, Music in the Great War and Soldier Songs.

Drama
The following drama programmes were broadcast: The Crimson Field, The Passing-Bells, War Poems, Great War Diaries, 37 Days, Our World War, Oh, What a Lovely War, All is Calm – The Christmas Truce, War Horse, Home Front and Tommies.

Across the UK
The following programmes were broadcast across the UK: Ireland's Great War, My Great-Granddad's Great War, With Love from the Front, The Man who Shot the Great War, Our Place in the War, And the Band Played Waltzing Matilda, Ballad of the Unknown Soldier, The Photograph/An Dealbh, Diary of World War One, Eòrpa – HMS Timbertown, The Handsome Lads/Na Gillean Grinn, The Battlefield/Sìnt' Sa Bhlàr, The School That Went to War, Shinty Heroes/Curaidhean Na Camanachd, Weekly War Briefing/Seachdain Sa Chogadh, Small Hands in a Big War, The Writers' Propaganda Bureau, Welsh Towns at War, Cymry 24, The Welsh and World War One/Cymry’r Rhyfel Byd Cyntaf, The Greatest Welshman Never Heard Of, The Great War Live, Wales and the Great War Today, The Man they Couldn't Kill – Frank Richards and the Great War and Stiwdio.

Children

Special editions

References

External links
Marking the centenary of World War One across the BBC

2014 British television series debuts
World War I television series
BBC history projects
English-language television shows
Centenary of the outbreak of World War I